In film distribution, counterprogramming is a studio's marketing strategy to distribute a film that appeals to audience demographics not targeted by another film or a non-film event. The United States film business is highly competitive and counterprogramming is a studio's way to maximize revenue. 

 

In 2003, a number of successes by specialty films during the summer season traditionally dominated by more commercial films inspired studios to release more specialty films in the summer as counterprogramming, rather than releasing them in the following autumn season. The strategy did not succeed because too many specialty films were scheduled for the summer of 2004 and competed with each other rather than the commercial films.

Studios also engage in counterprogramming in response to major non-film events. The film grossed  on its opening weekend and ranked first at the box office. 

In 2012, Slates Jim Pagels reported that the year's film schedule in the United States lacked counterprogramming compared to previous years. Pagels said studios found counterprogramming riskier because films' second-weekend box office performances had steeper drops from their opening-weekend performances than in the past. He said, "Studios can't afford to suffer a slow start and make it up in later weeks." The decrease in counterprogramming was also attributed to commercial films catering to more demographics, particularly the female demographic. The year's The Dark Knight Rises from Warner Bros. had no competition on its opening weekend since no rival studio wanted to compete with the film.

References

External links
Why Is 'Straight Outta Compton' Considered Counterprogramming? at Forbes, August 14, 2015
Watch: Tina Fey And Amy Poehler's 'Sisters' Embraces Its Destiny As 'Star Wars' Counterprogramming at Forbes, December 3, 2015
'Big Fat Greek Wedding 2' walks a precarious counterprogramming path taking on 'Batman v Superman' at Los Angeles Times, March 24, 2016
'The Big Sick' and the health of the summer counter-programmer at Los Angeles Times, July 13, 2017
How Marvel Annihilated Counterprogramming at The Ringer, May 14, 2018

Film distribution
Marketing strategy